Sanji is a village in Chengjiao, Shaowu, in Nanping, a prefecture-level city in northwestern Fujian province, China. It is located in the central part of the Wuyi Mountains, southeast of Shaowu.

Climate 
Sanji, like the rest of Nanping, has a monsoon-influenced humid subtropical climate (Köppen Cfa), with short, mild winters and very hot, humid summers. There is a marked decline in rainfall in autumn and early winter, and rainfall is both frequent and heavy during spring and early summer.

See also
 List of villages in China

Notes and references

Villages in China
Populated places in Fujian
Nanping